Alencar Santana Braga (born 14 March 1976) is a Brazilian politician from the Workers' Party. He has been Minority Leader of the Chamber of Deputies since 16 February 2022.

References 

1976 births
Living people
Workers' Party (Brazil) politicians

21st-century Brazilian politicians
Members of the Chamber of Deputies (Brazil) from São Paulo
Members of the Legislative Assembly of São Paulo